Matt Cook is professor of modern history at Birkbeck College, University of London.

Selected publications
London and the Culture of Homosexuality, 1885 - 1914 (Cambridge: Cambridge University Press, 2003).
A Gay History of Britain: Love and Sex Between Men since the Middle Ages (Oxford: Greenwood, 2007) – editor and lead author.
Queer 1950s: Rethinking Sexuality in the Post-war Years (Basingstoke: Palgrave Macmillan, 2012) – co-editor with Heike Bauer.
Queer Cities, Queer Cultures: Sexuality and Urban Life in post-1945 Europe (London: Continuum, 2014) - co-editor with Jennifer Evans.
Queer Domesticities: Homosexuality and Home Life in Twentieth-Century London (London: Palgrave, 2014).

References 

Living people
Year of birth missing (living people)
British historians
Academics of Birkbeck, University of London
Academics of Keele University
Historians of LGBT topics